Klemen Štrajhar (born 20 August 1994) is a Slovenian archer. He competed in the men’s individual event at the 2012 Summer Olympics.

References

External links
 

Slovenian male archers
1994 births
Living people
Archers at the 2012 Summer Olympics
Olympic archers of Slovenia
Sportspeople from Ljubljana